Digitonthophagus is a genus of Scarabaeidae or scarab beetles in the superfamily Scarabaeoidea. It was considered a subgenus of Onthophagus by some authorities. A review of the taxon was published in 2017.

Species
 Digitonthophagus aksumensis Genier
 Digitonthophagus biflagellatus Genier
 Digitonthophagus bonasus Fabricius, 1775
 Digitonthophagus catta Fabricius, 1787
 Digitonthophagus dilatatus Genier
 Digitonthophagus eucatta Genier
 Digitonthophagus falciger Genier
 Digitonthophagus fimator Genier
 Digitonthophagus gazella Fabricius, 1787
 Digitonthophagus lusinganus d'Orbigny, 1905
 Digitonthophagus namaquensis Genier
 Digitonthophagus petilus Genier
 Digitonthophagus sahelicus Moretto
 Digitonthophagus uks Genier
 Digitonthophagus ulcerosus Genier
 Digitonthophagus viridicollis Genier

References

External links

Scarabaeinae